Kovilam Padu is a village in Chandrasekharapuram (C.S. Puram) Mandal of Prakasam district in the state of Andhra Pradesh in India.

References 

Villages in Prakasam district